Arsen Aslanbekovich Kaytov (born 2 July 1989) is a Russian professional football player.

Club career
He made his professional debut for FC Saturn Ramenskoye on 27 June 2007 in the Russian Cup game against FC SKA-Energiya Khabarovsk.

External links
 

1989 births
Sportspeople from Vladikavkaz
Living people
Russian footballers
Association football defenders
FC Saturn Ramenskoye players
FC Spartak Vladikavkaz players
FC Armavir players
FC KAMAZ Naberezhnye Chelny players
FC Van players
Russian First League players
Russian Second League players
Armenian First League players
Russian expatriate footballers
Russian expatriate sportspeople in Armenia
Expatriate footballers in Armenia